Moradabad-e Mirakhur (also Romanized as Morādābād-e Mīrākhūr and Morādābād-e Mīr Ākhvor; also known as Morādābād) is a village in Mirbag-e Shomali Rural District, in the Central District of Delfan County, Lorestan Province, Iran. According to the 2006 census, its population was 239 people from 53 families.

References 

Towns and villages in Delfan County